Aleksey Krupnyakov (born May 28, 1978) is a male freestyle wrestler from Kyrgyzstan. He is a two-time Olympyian, competing in both the 2004 Summer Olympics and 2008 Summer Olympics. Krupnyakov originally won his 2nd bronze medal at the Wrestling World Championships in 2010, but was stripped after testing positive for steroids. During his 2-year suspension he competed in MMA, compiling a record of 5-0, finishing all opponents in the 1st round. He returned to wrestling in 2013.

External links
 
 Bio on fila-wrestling.com
 

Living people
1978 births
Russian male sport wrestlers
Kyrgyzstani male sport wrestlers
Olympic wrestlers of Kyrgyzstan
Wrestlers at the 2004 Summer Olympics
Wrestlers at the 2008 Summer Olympics
Sportspeople from Kaliningrad
Russian emigrants to Kyrgyzstan
Kyrgyzstani people of Russian descent
Asian Games medalists in wrestling
Wrestlers at the 2002 Asian Games
Wrestlers at the 2006 Asian Games
World Wrestling Championships medalists
Asian Games silver medalists for Kyrgyzstan
Asian Games bronze medalists for Kyrgyzstan
Medalists at the 2002 Asian Games
Medalists at the 2006 Asian Games